Xinghua Road Subdistrict is a subdistrict of western Licang District, Qingdao, People's Republic of China. , it has seven residential communities under its administration.

See also 
 List of township-level divisions of Shandong

References 

Township-level divisions of Shandong
Subdistricts of the People's Republic of China
Geography of Qingdao